Prensal is a white wine grape variety from the Balearic Islands, Spain. It is an authorised variety of the island's wine region of Binissalem (DOP), and there were 145 ha (359 acres) of Prensal grown in Spain in 2015.

Synonyms 
Moll, Pensal Blanca, Premsal, Premsal, and Prensal Blanc are further names for Prensal.

References

Spanish wine
Grape varieties of Spain
White wine grape varieties